Anthony Carl "Tony" Kovaleski (born 1959) is an investigative reporter currently working at Denver ABC Scripps' KMGH-Channel 7. Previously Kovaleski worked at NBC Bay Area, KNTV in the San Francisco Bay Area. From 2001 to 2011, he was the investigative reporter at KMGH-TV in Denver, Colorado.

Early life
Kovaleski was born in Iron River, Michigan and graduated from San Jose State University.

Professional career

Kovaleski joined the NBC Bay Area Investigative team in December, 2011. His most recent work includes exposing problems at sporting venues throughout California. His investigations into Santa Clara County's VTA Light Rail system have exposed abnormally high fair evasion rates.  His second report showed that after two years, the light rail system was still unable to provide credit card readers for its riders. In addition, his reporting on mechanical breakdowns of a major East Bay school bus provider alerted several East Bay school districts to a history of unreported problems.

In the summer of 2008, while at KMGH-TV in Denver, Kovaleski aired a series of stories that chronicled problems with emergency ambulance service in Denver including response times that were nearly double the national standard. The stories also showed there was no permanently stationed ambulance at Denver International Airport even though the facility was more than twenty miles from the city center.

In December 2008, more than 100 people were on Continental Airlines Flight 1404 when the pilot lost control. The plane slid off Runway 34 Right and burst into flames during take-off. Kovaleski obtained records of the ambulance response showing the first emergency ambulance needed 33 minutes to reach the scene. The investigative documentary "33 Minutes to 34 Right" aired in March, 2009 and lead to significant changes in Denver's ambulance procedures and policies including the permanent assignment of an ambulance at DIA.

In May 2010, Kovaleski reported on several state-appointed board members of Pinnacol Assurance accepting gifts and an all- expense-paid trip to Pebble Beach. The board was tasked with oversight of Pinnacol Assurance including the agency's spending. Kovaleski's investigation forced an overhaul of the board including the appointment of a new president and the implementation of strict regulations on travel and gifts accepted by board members.

Kovaleski’s source based investigative reporting landed interviews with four members of Denver’s FBI that produced a look inside the federal investigation and conviction of admitted terrorist Najibullah Zazi. The 30-minute documentary provided insight into how the Denver’s FBI office unraveled a national terror plot targeting New York City.

Awards

In his two decades working as a reporter Kovaleski has been honored with more than four dozen national and local awards including the Alfred I. duPont-Columbia Award in 2010, the 2011 National Emmy Award for Investigative Reporting, the National Edward R. Murrow Award for Investigative Reporting  the Sigma Delta Chi Award and the National Headliner Award.

His 25 Emmy Awards include recognition for writing, investigative reporting, live reporting and journalistic enterprise. In 2004 and 2006, the Colorado Broadcasters Association named Kovaleski the state’s “Best Specialty Reporter.” He has been honored several times by the Associated Press and the Radio Television Digital News Association. In 1997, the Texas Associated Press named Kovaleski that state's "Reporter of the Year."

In December 2011, Kovaleski and his colleagues John Ferrugia and Theresa Marchetta were recognized by Denver's 5280 Magazine as one of the 50 Most Powerful People in Colorado. The Call7 Investigative Team ranked 27th Most Powerful in the state of Colorado, according to the magazine. The investigative team members were the only journalists recognized by the magazine in its annual report.

Career history

Kovaleski joined NBC Bay Area in December 2011 as the Chief Investigative Reporter. Kovaleski returned to Denver ABC Scripps' KMGH-Channel 7  on November 11, 2015, as investigative reporter.

Before moving to the Bay Area, Kovaleski spent more than a decade as a member of KMGH-TV's Call7 Investigators, one of the most highly decorated investigative units in the country. In all, he has more than two decades of experience as an investigative reporter. His resume includes work in Houston (KPRC), Phoenix (KTVK & KNXV) and Reno (KTVN).

Sources

External links
Bio at NBC Bay Area

1959 births
Living people
American investigative journalists
San Jose State University alumni
People from Iron River, Michigan
People from San Jose, California
University of Nevada, Reno faculty
Journalists from California